Deep Trap (previously known as Exchange) is a 2015 South Korean crime thriller film starring Ma Dong-seok, Jo Han-sun and Kim Min-kyung, and directed by Kwon Hyung-jin. Based on an actual SNS crime, it depicts the terror experienced by a married couple while on a trip to an isolated island. It won Best Film Award in the Orient Express section at the Fantasporto in 2016.

Cast 
 Ma Dong-seok as Park Sung-chul
 Jo Han-sun as Kwon Jun-sik
 Kim Min-kyung as Lee So-yeon
 Ji An as Kim Min-hee
 Kang Seung-wan as Chang-gyoo
 Jeong Gi-seop as Constable Hwang
 Song Tae-yoon as Newcomer

Reception

References

External links 
 
 
 

2015 films
2015 crime thriller films
South Korean crime thriller films
2010s Korean-language films
Films about social media
2010s South Korean films